Greenwell Matongo is a suburb in the city of Windhoek, the capital city of Namibia. Greenwell Matongo is named after a liberation fighter, Greenwell Simasiku Matongo, who was born in 1945.  Matongo was a former People Liberation Army of Namibia (PLAN), who died in combat between United National Union of the Total Independence of Angola (UNITA) and South African forces at Angola in Onjiva in 15 June 1979. This residential area is known for its many shebeens and bars.

Despite its synonymous association with informal entertainment areas, Greenwell Matongo is host to a community library, the Greenwell Matongo Community Library for the benefit of its residents.

External links 
 Homepage of Greenwell Matongo Community Center

References

Suburbs of Windhoek
Shanty towns in Namibia